Russell G. Lloyd Jr. (born c. 1956) is an American Republican politician, the city controller of Evansville, Indiana, a former mayor, who served from 2000 until 2003, and a former city council member. Lloyd is also a certified public accountant.

He was elected in 1999 and lost reelection in 2003.

Lloyd is one of six children of Genevieve A. and Russell G. Lloyd Sr., who served as mayor from 1971 until 1979. His father was shot and killed in 1980; his mother died in 2011 after an extended illness. His sister Mary M. Lloyd is the Superior Court chief judge for Vanderburgh County.

Electoral history
1999 mayoral

2003 mayoral

References

External links
Russell G. Lloyd, Jr. entry at The Political Graveyard

Place of birth missing (living people)
Year of birth uncertain
Living people
Indiana Republicans
Mayors of Evansville, Indiana
Year of birth missing (living people)